Esterina is a 1959 Italian drama film directed by Carlo Lizzani. It was entered into the main competition at the 20th Venice International Film Festival, in which Carla Gravina received a special mention for her performance.

Cast 

Carla Gravina: Esterina
Geoffrey Horne: Gino
Domenico Modugno: Piero
Anna Maria Aveta:  Piero's Wife
Silvana Jachino: Landlady
Laura Nucci: Hooker
Raimondo Van Riel: Old man

References

External links

 
1959 films
Films directed by Carlo Lizzani
Films scored by Carlo Rustichelli
Italian drama films
1950s Italian films